Kamara Namouri (born January 10, 1996) is a Guinean football player who currently plays for Balikpapan in the Indonesia Super League.

References

External links
Camara Namory at Liga Indonesia

1994 births
Living people
Malian footballers
Malian expatriate footballers
Malian expatriate sportspeople in Indonesia
Expatriate footballers in Indonesia
Liga 1 (Indonesia) players
PSPS Pekanbaru players
Olympique Club de Khouribga players
Association football midfielders
21st-century Malian people